Dokri Tehsil is an administrative subdivision (tehsil) of Larkana District in the Sindh province of Pakistan, the city of Larkano is the capital.

Administration
Dokri tehsil is administratively subdivided into 13 Union Councils.

References

Talukas of Sindh
Larkana District